Rinaldo Fiumi (born 2 August 1923) was an Italian professional football player.

1923 births
Possibly living people
Italian footballers
Serie A players
Spezia Calcio players
Inter Milan players
S.S.C. Bari players
Association football midfielders